Live in Chicago 1965 is a live album by The Beach Boys, released on December 6, 2015. It was originally recorded in 1965.

Background

The compilation's release was a result of revised European copyright laws, forcing some labels to publish unreleased archival material so that they would not lose their copyright. Live in Chicago 1965 is one of two such releases by Capitol Records in 2015, and the other was Beach Boys' Party! Uncovered and Unplugged.

Track listing
First Show – Live at the Arie Crown Theater, Chicago – March 26, 1965

"Intro"
"Do You Wanna Dance"
"Little Honda"
"Surfin’ U.S.A."
"Don’t Worry Baby"
"Papa-Oom-Mow-Mow"
"Monster Mash"
"Louie Louie"
"Hawaii"
"Surfer Girl"
"Runaway"
"Shut Down"
"Wendy"
"Please Let Me Wonder"
"Fun Fun Fun"
"I Get Around"
"Johnny B. Goode"

Second Show – Live at the Arie Crown Theater, Chicago – March 27, 1965
"Intro"
"Do You Wanna Dance"
"Hawaii"
"Please Let Me Wonder"
"Surfer Girl"
"Runaway"
"Louie Louie"
"Fun Fun Fun"
"409"
"Shut Down"
"Monster Mash"
"Surfin’ U.S.A."
"Little Honda"
"Wendy"
"In My Room"
"Don’t Worry Baby"
"I Get Around"
"Johnny B. Goode"
"Papa-Oom-Mow-Mow"

Rehearsals
"Louie Louie"
"Little Honda"
"Surfin’ U.S.A."
"Wendy"

References

2015 live albums
The Beach Boys live albums
Capitol Records compilation albums
ITunes-exclusive releases